Mandela is a 2021 Indian Tamil-language political satire  television film written and directed by Madonne Ashwin on his directorial debut and produced by S. Sashikanth and Ramachandra of YNOT Studios while director Balaji Mohan, co-produced the film under his banner Open Window Productions. The film being titled after the late South African President Nelson Mandela, stars Yogi Babu in the titular lead role while Sheela Rajkumar, Kanna Ravi, Sangili Murugan and G. M. Sundar play supportive roles. The music for the film is composed by Bharath Sankar, whereas cinematography and editing were handled by Vidhu Ayyanna and Philomin Raj respectively.

The film is set on the backdrop of a village panchayat election scenario between two political parties where a local barber's vote will determine the fate of the election. The film was directly released via Star Vijay on 4 April 2021 and internationally through Netflix, the following day. The film received widespread critical acclaim praising the script, performances and technical aspects of the film. It was shortlisted as one among the 14 Indian films to be nominated for Best Foreign Film at the 94th Academy Awards scheduled to be held in mid-2022. At the 68th National Film Awards, it won 2 awards for Best Debut Film of a Director and Best Screenplay (Dialogues), both for Madonne Ashwin.

Plot 
In a small village named Soorangudi in Tamil Nadu, the population of around 1000 people are split into two caste-based factions, Northerners and Southerners. When the long unopposed President of the Village becomes paralyzed months before election, his two sons decide to run for president. The election is also divided along caste lines, as elder son's mother is a Northerner and others is a Southener. Based on pre-polling it turns out the vote is split. The tie breaker vote falls upon a local hairstylist named Smile alias Nelson Mandela (Yogi Babu) who recently joined the voter list. The rest of the movie is about who gets Nelson Mandela's vote to win. In the process, Mandela gets the two contenders to improve the village by laying a road, building a school etc. with their wealth. The movie ends with a 'surprise' result to the election that is not disclosed but is inferred that the village of Soorangudi won.

Cast 

 Yogi Babu as Nelson Mandela (Smile)
 Sheela Rajkumar as Thenmozhi
 Sangili Murugan as Periya Ayya
 G. M. Sundar as Rathnam
 Mukesh as supporting role
 Kanna Ravi as Mathi
 Senthi Kumari as Valli
 George Maryan as BLO Officer
 Deepa Shankar as Rathnam's wife
 Saranya Ravikumar as Vairamuthu
 Prasanna Balachandran as Sudalai

Production 
The film was announced by debutant director Madonne Ashwin in July 2019, and the principal photography of the film began the very same day. Yogi Babu was roped into playing the lead role in the film as a barber. Director Balaji Mohan came on board as co-producer of the film which also marked his maiden feature film production venture for his Open Window Productions banner. Madonne who was a participant in the reality show Naalaya Iyakunar came up with the script to Balaji who expressed his interest in setting a production venture, but to have a wide reach, he roped in producer S. Sashikanth to jointly produce the film. Talking about the script, Balaji stated, "It is a social satire, set against a rural backdrop. It talks about quite a few things that are relevant in today’s scenario. Though it will have humour, it will be more sensible and meaningful."

The shooting procedure of the film was wrapped up in November 2019 with just a single schedule.

Soundtrack 

The music is composed by Bharath Sankar of the Oorka band. The soundtrack album featured six tracks with lyrics written by Yugabharathi, Arivu, Mamiliva Randriamihajasoa, Pradeep Kumar and Bharath Sankar. One song "Oru Needhi Onbadhu Saadhi" was released as a single on 19 March 2021, and the remaining tracks were released on 28 March 2021, through Sony Music label.

Release 
It was revealed that the theatre owners and distributors issued a red card against the film's production house YNOT Studios, over the digital release of Dhanush's Jagame Thandhiram (2021), and stated that the distributors will not screen any of the upcoming films belonging to the production company. As a result, YNOT Studios decided to release the film as a direct television premiere on Star Vijay on 4 April 2021 and the film would be globally streamed via Netflix on 9 April 2021. However, the Netflix release was brought forward to 5 April 2021, as they wanted to release the film before the Tamil Nadu Legislative Assembly Elections. The film's theatrical premiere was held at PVR Cinemas, Chennai on 31 March 2021.

Reception 
The film received critical acclaim. Thinkal Menon from The Times of India praised the performances of the cast and technical aspects, and wrote that the film is "outright hilarious from the word go, though it deals with umpteen relevant, sensitive topics". Menon further gave three-and-a-half out of five stars for the film. Ranjani Krishnakumar of Firstpost gave 4 stars (out of 5) for the film, further stating it as "Mandela is a film that will remind us of our priorities. It will encourage us to think about our rights as people and our power when we're together, and will also stand as a thoughtful and optimistic view of democracy, for one and all." Giving three out of five stars, Behindwoods further added "A stellar Yogi Babu and some honest, nuanced writing makes Mandela entertaining."

The Indian Express chief critic Manoj Kumar R, wrote "This political satire is direct and obvious in its messaging. And that adds to the movie's strengths and makes the narration more effective", and rated the film three out of five. Srivatsan S of The Hindu wrote "‘Mandela’ is a first-rate political satire that shows how deep-seated caste is, by taking an unflinching yet unsentimental look." Haricharan Pudipeddi of Hindustan Times wrote "The film allows Yogi Babu to truly showcase his potential and he plays the titular character with so much sincerity." Navien Darshan of Cinema Express gave 3.5 stars (out of 5) stating it as "A hilarious and yet, hard hitting entertainer backed by strong writing and performances".

Accolades

Controversy 
People from Maruthuvar community and Barber's profession have condemned the film for poor portrayal of their profession and community. SK Raja, the president of Tamil Nadu Barbers Welfare Association, accused the filmmakers, stating that denigrates their community and profession and propagates prejudice and social injustice. A petition was filed by R Munusamy, the president of the Tamil Nadu Hair Dressers Union, on 21 April, alleged that the film contains several objectionable scenes that speak ill about the barber community.

Notes

References

External links 
 

2020s Tamil-language films
2021 comedy-drama films
2021 directorial debut films
2021 films
2021 television films
Comedy television films
Drama television films
Films not released in theaters due to the COVID-19 pandemic
Indian comedy-drama films
Indian political comedy-drama films
Indian satirical films
Indian television films